Crossfire is a Scottish regional television current affairs programme produced and broadcast by Grampian Television between 1984 and 2004.

The programme covered political, business and social issues concerning the northern Scotland region and was the successor to the long-running Points North series, broadcast between 1961 and 1984.

Crossfire was also broadcast in the Scottish Television region during the late 1990s and early 2000s. The programme was axed in 2004 to make way for a new political programme entitled Politics Now, co-produced by Scottish and Grampian (now STV Central and STV North respectively).

External links

 (STV Player)

1984 Scottish television series debuts
2004 Scottish television series endings
1980s Scottish television series
1990s Scottish television series
2000s Scottish television series
Politics of Scotland
Scottish television shows
STV News
Television shows produced by Grampian Television